Ernst Fuchs may refer to:

Ernst Fuchs (artist) (1930–2015), Austrian artist
Ernst Fuchs (cyclist) (1936–1994), Swiss cyclist
Ernst Fuchs (doctor) (1851–1930), Austrian ophthalmologist
Ernst Fuchs (theologian) (1903–1983) German New Testament scholar and student of Rudolf Bultmann